Handeloh is a municipality in the district of Harburg, in Lower Saxony, Germany.

Geography

Location 
Handeloh lies between the rivers Seeve and Este, south of Buchholz in der Nordheide. The Harburg Hills lie to the northwest and the Lüneburg Heath Nature Reserve to the southeast. The parish belongs to the collective municipality of Tostedt, whose seat is in the village of Tostedt.

Neighbouring communities 
 Welle
 Otter
 Undeloh
 Buchholz in der Nordheide

Sub-divisions 
Handeloh has the following sub-divisions: Handeloh, Höckel, Inzmühlen and Wörme.

Politics

Parish council 
The parish council, which was elected on 11 September 2011, is made up as follows:
Freie Wählergemeinschaft Handeloh 4 seats
CDU 4 seats
SPD 2 seats
Bündnis 90/Die Grünen 2 seats
single candidate 1 seat
(as at: the local elections on 11 September 2011)

Coat-of-arms 
On the left hand side of the shield, in the upper half a gold wagon wheel with 8 spokes on green, in the lower half two blue wavy lines on silver, on the right hand side a black pine with four roots on gold.

Meaning: The wagon wheel symbolises the former importance of forestry in the parish. The two wavy lines represent the rivers Este and Seeve that flow through the parish. The dense woods are portrayed by the pine tree whose four roots symbolise the four villages in the parish association.

Culture and places of interest

Museums 
 The Alte Schmiede ("Old Smithy") Natural History Museum and Training School
Exhibitions cover the local bird world, mammals and birds of North Germany, including the coasts, local amphibians and reptiles.
The training school hosts seminars for employees in nature conservation management and support.

Economy and infrastructure

Transport 

The village is served by two stations on the Heath Railway (Heidebahn): Handeloh and Büsenbachtal. The latter also serves the village of Wörme and the Büsenbach valley walking area.
In addition the station of Handeloh on the Heath Railway is the last stop within the HVV tariff zone. However since 2008 season tickets have been valid to Soltau.

Media 
A manor house (Reiterhof) in Handeloh was the main setting for the 52-part TV series Neues vom Süderhof.

External links 
 Handeloh parish

References 

Harburg (district)